Njabini is a small town in Nyandarua County, Kenya.

It lies to the east of the Aberdare ranges and due to this receives a significant proportion of the rainfall in the region. It's a highly productive agricultural area with vegetables being the mainstay. Njabini town is the administrative district for Kinangop division. Approximately 40% of the population have clean accessible water. Electricity is supplied mainly to residential and commercial properties but high installation costs put it out of reach of many residents. The Sasumua and Chania rivers traverse the area. They both merge and drain into the Sasumua dam. The impounded water is treated at the water works before being piped to Nairobi. The treated water accounts for roughly 30% of the capital's requirements.

Education
There are several primary schools which serve the local community. These are Chania Primary School, Kimathi Primary school, Njabini Primary School, Kiburu Road Primary School, Mucibau Primary School, and Sasumua Primary School. There are five secondary schools: Njabini Boys High School, Mt. Kinangop Girls High School, Njabini Girls School, St' Anuarite Secondary School, Mucibau Secondary and Aberdare Girls. There is also one technical college in Njabini.

Major site 

 Sasumua Dam
 Aberdare ranges,

References 

Populated places in Central Province (Kenya)
Nyandarua County